En på miljonen is a 2005 compilation album by Grönwalls.

Track listing
Älskar du mig ännu
En på miljonen
Börja var enkelt
Tänk om
Vinden har vänt
Falling in Love
Om jag bara kunde få dig att förstå
Meningen med allt
Vem
Du har det där
Regn i mitt hjärta
Du ringde från Flen
I varje andetag
Ett liv tillsammans
En plats i solen
Jag ringer upp
Tillbaks igen

Charts

References 

2005 compilation albums
Compilation albums by Swedish artists
Grönwalls albums
Swedish-language compilation albums